My Favorite Highway was an American pop rock band, originally formed in 2004 by cousins Dave Cook and Will Cook in the city of Fairfax, Virginia. While still unsigned the band recorded and released two EPs and one full-length album, selling over 100,000 digital singles independently before signing a major label record deal with Virgin Records in 2008. In 2009, Virgin Records re-released the band's record, "How To Call A Bluff", with the addition of two new songs, "Go" and Dreamer". Their song, "Say So", received moderate radio airplay throughout the U.S. during 2009. Many of the band's songs have appeared on popular TV shows such as MTV's The Hills, Laguna Beach, The City and The CW's Fly Girls and 90210. They played at The Bamboozle in 2009 and 2010 and have toured with artists such as The Cab, Hellogoodbye, Fun, Forever The Sickest Kids, The Rocket Summer, and Kelly Clarkson, among others. My Favorite Highway disbanded in September 2010.

Members
Dave Cook - Vocals, Guitar, Piano
Will Cook - Bass
Pat Jenkins - Guitar, Backup Vocals
Bobby Morgenthaler - Drums
Chris Loizou - Drums
Andrew Goldstein - Guitar
Brian Morgenthaler - Guitar
Ryan Seaman - Drums (touring only)

Discography
The Pre-Release (Independent - August 30, 2005)
Anywhere But Here (Independent - November 14, 2006)
How to Call a Bluff (Independent - July 13, 2008)
How to Call a Bluff (Virgin Records - May 5, 2009)

References

External links
My Favorite Highway Biography

American pop rock music groups
Musical groups established in 2004
Musical groups disestablished in 2010
Musical groups from Virginia
Virgin Records artists